The Small Price of a Bicycle is the second studio album by The Icicle Works. The album was released in 1985 and charted at number 55 in the UK  Despite the success of the band's first album in North America, it was not released in either the US or Canada, with Arista Records in the US memorably rejecting it as "punk-rock demos".

In Canada, an early version of the track "Book of Reason" was released by Vertigo Records on their 1984 Vertigo Sampler 2-LP set, with a note that the track was from the forthcoming Icicle Works LP.   However, the LP never actually forthcame; instead, Vertigo Canada issued a 5-track EP called Seven Horses Deep.  This EP included the so-called "American Version" of "Seven Horses" (which was never actually issued in the US), the single version of "All The Daughters", and the previously issued UK b-sides "(Let's Go) Down to the River", "Beggars Legacy" and "Goin' Back".

In 2011, Cherry Red Records issued a 3-CD expanded edition of The Small Price of a Bicycle.  Disc 1 featured the original album in its entirety, while discs 2 and 3 featured a wealth of related demos, b-sides, radio sessions, live tracks, remixes and unreleased session outtakes.

Critical reception

The album was reviewed by Roger Holland for the music magazine Sounds where it received a perfect score of five stars out of five. Holland wrote that The Small Price of a Bicycle was "a very fine album" and praised its "combinations of exuberant young rock rhythms and enchanting, inspiring vocals".

Track listing

UK Edition
All tracks composed by Ian McNabb; except where indicated
"Hollow Horse" (McNabb, Chris Layhe) – 4:00
"Perambulator" (McNabb, Chris Layhe) – 4:02
"Seven Horses" – 4:12
"Rapids" – 4:32
"Windfall" – 4:13
"Assumed Sundown" – 5:53
"Saint's Sojourn" – 4:33
"All the Daughters (Of Her Father's House)" – 4:40
"Book of Reason" – 3:45
"Conscience of Kings" – 4:48

2011 Expanded Edition

Personnel
The Icicle Works
 Robert Ian McNabb – guitar, lead vocals, keyboards
 Chris Layhe – bass, backing vocals, keyboards, violin
 Chris Sharrock – drums, percussion

References

1985 albums
The Icicle Works albums
Albums produced by Hugh Jones (producer)
Beggars Banquet Records albums